The Ulakhan-Sis Range is a mountain range in the Sakha Republic, Far Eastern Federal District, Russia.

This range is one of the areas of Yakutia where baydzharakhs are found. Kigilyakh rock formations are also found on this range, some of them quite impressive.

History
The Ulakhan-Sis was first mapped in the summer of 1870 by geographer and ethnologist Baron Gerhard von Maydell (1835–1894) during his pioneering research of East Siberia.

Kular is an abandoned settlement that was located in the range area.

Geography
The Ulakhan-Sis Range rises in the southeastern limits of the Yana-Indigirka Lowland, northwest and west of the Kolyma Lowland and northeast of the Aby Lowland, along the interfluve of the Erna and Shandrin rivers in the northwest, Shangina in the south, and Khatysty and Arga-Yuryakh in the southeast.

To the north rises the Kondakov Plateau, a lower and wider extension of the range. In the west, the Polousny Range, a prolongation of the range on the other side of the Indigirka River, stretches further westwards. To the south, at a certain distance, rises the Alazeya Plateau. Rivers Bolshaya Ercha, a tributary of the Indigirka, and Arga-Yuryakh, of the Alazeya basin, have their sources in the range. 

The range has mountains of middle height and smooth slopes with larch forests at the bottom of the valleys.

References

External links

Ulakhan-Sis stones: a white spot on the map of Yakutia - National Geographic

Mountain ranges of the Sakha Republic